A sequestrant is a food additive which improves the quality and stability of foods. A sequestrant forms chelate complexes with polyvalent metal ions, especially copper, iron and nickel, which can prevent the oxidation of the fats in the food. Sequestrants are a type of preservative.

The name comes from Latin and means "to withdraw from use" .

Common sequestrants are:
 Calcium chloride (E509)
 Calcium acetate (E263)
 Calcium disodium ethylene diamine tetra-acetate (E385)
 Glucono delta-lactone (E575)
 Sodium gluconate (E576)
 Potassium gluconate (E577)
 Sodium tripolyphosphate (E451)
 Sodium hexametaphosphate (E452i)

Sodium and calcium salts of EDTA are also commonly used in many foods and beverages.

Food additives